Brygida Kürbis (born 11 September 1921 in Chełmno, d. 5 November 2001 in Poznań) was a Polish historian, medievalist and source editor. She focused on history of the Polish historiography and culture in middleages, dziejach historiografii i kulturze średniowiecza polskiego na tle europejskim.

In 1951 she gained PhD in history, in 1957 she passed her habilitation. Brygida Kürbis was one of editor-in-chief of academic journal "Studia Źródłoznawcze".

Publications
 Studia nad Kroniką wielkopolską (1952).
 Dziejopisarstwo wielkopolskie XIII i XIV w. (1959).
 Myśli i nauki Mistrza Wincentego zwanego Kadłubkiem (1980).
 Na progach historii, Vol. 1–2 (1994–2001).

Bibliography
 Splitt J. A., Kalisia Nowa, Miesięcznik Społeczno-Kulturalny, No. 12, Kalisz 1998.
 Strzelczyk J., Wspomnienie pośmiertne. Brygida Kürbis, "Roczniki Historyczne", Vol. 67 (2001).

Polish women historians
1921 births
2001 deaths
20th-century Polish historians